The 1913 Carlisle Indians football team represented the Carlisle Indian Industrial School as an independent during the 1913 college football season. Led by 12th-year head coach Pop Warner, the Indians compiled a record of 10–1–1 and outscored opponents 296 to 53. The victory over Dartmouth was a great upset.

Schedule

See also
 1913 College Football All-America Team

References

Carlisle
Carlisle Indians football seasons
Carlisle Indians football